Jiangsu Baipu Middle School was established in the spring of 1950. It is located in Baipu town, in Rugao City, Jiangsu province, China, occupying about 106,700 square meters. There are fifty eight classes and three thousand and six hundred members in the school. In recent years, large dining rooms, laboratories and gyms have been constructed. Various equipment were provided to students for exercise in gym.

Jiangsu Baipu Middle School is a comprehensive school consisting of junior and senior parts. In junior school, students are at an average of 16 years old while in senior one students are older than them, among 16 years old to 20 years old. They all have their own fixed classroom, one is on the left of Wenjin River and the other one is on the right. In the school, there are different activities organized by the students' union, aiming to provide more chances for students to show themselves and improve their ability.

There are 230 staffs in the school, and about 100 teachers have the title of senior and junior professional post. Among them, there are many young teachers. In recent years, all teachers manage to conduct scientific research as well as teaching. Every year there are over 150 published papers appearing in famous magazines. The principal Fan Jianyin is an experienced head master, and he created a new kind of learning -giving students main points of knowledge on unfixed papers. In this way, students can learn in a new way and understand the important points of what teachers want to teach.

References

External links
 Official site
 https://web.archive.org/web/20120426000835/http://www.jsbpzx.net.cn/contents/105/1022.html
 http://xx.226500.com/Info-296.html
 http://v.youku.com/v_show/id_XMjE4NzA5NDQ0.html

Schools in Jiangsu